Michael Lipper (1 June 1932 – 18 October 1987) was an Irish Labour Party politician who served for four years as an Independent TD for the Limerick East constituency.

An employee of CIÉ, Lipper was elected to Limerick City Council as a member of Clann na Poblachta at the 1960 local elections. He then joined the Labour Party and was an unsuccessful candidate at the 1968 by-election, the 1969 general election and the 1973 general election, in the general elections trailing behind the incumbent Labour TD Stephen Coughlan.

The relationship between Lipper and Coughlan was always poor and Lipper stood as a "Democratic Labour" candidate at the 1977 general election, unseating Coughlan as TD and gaining a seat in Dáil Éireann. After returning to the Labour Party he lost his seat at the 1981 general election, to the independent socialist candidate and former supporter, Jim Kemmy. At the February 1982 general election Kemmy held the seat with an increased vote. Lipper did not stand for the Dáil again.

He also served as Mayor of Limerick from 1973 to 1974.

References

 

Independent TDs
Labour Party (Ireland) politicians
1932 births
1987 deaths
Members of the 21st Dáil
Mayors of Limerick (city)
Local councillors in County Limerick
Clann na Poblachta politicians